Cameraria ostryarella is a moth of the family Gracillariidae. It is known from Ontario and Quebec in Canada, and Illinois, Kentucky, Maine, Michigan, New York, Connecticut and Vermont in the United States.

The wingspan is 6–7 mm.

The larvae feed on Ostrya species, including Ostrya virginiana and Ostrya virginica. They mine the leaves of their host plant. The mine has the form of a blotch mine on the upperside of the leaf. As many as four or five may occur in one mine. The hibernating larvae pass the winter in circular silken-lined chambers, the outline appearing on the upper epidermis as a circular narrow ridge.

References

External links
mothphotographersgroup
Cameraria at microleps.org

Cameraria (moth)
Moths described in 1871

Lepidoptera of the United States
Lepidoptera of Canada
Moths of North America
Leaf miners
Taxa named by Vactor Tousey Chambers